Epidaus is a genus of assassin bugs with about 25 species mainly distributed mainly in the Oriental Realm with two species (E. nebulo and E. tuberosus) which extend into the Palearctic Realm. Most species have a long and narrow body with the pronotum having a posterior margin with raised corners and spiny outgrowths facing outwards. The head a tubercle behind the base of each of the two antennae.

Species included in the genus include:
 Epidaus alternus 
 Epidaus atrispinus 
 Epidaus bachmaensis 
 Epidaus bicolor 
 Epidaus compressispinus 
 Epidaus connectens 
 Epidaus conspersus 
 Epidaus famulus 
 Epidaus furculatus 
 Epidaus incomptus 
 Epidaus insularis 
 Epidaus kedahensis 
 Epidaus latispinus 
 Epidaus longispinus 
 Epidaus maculiger 
 Epidaus nebulo 
 Epidaus pantolabus 
 Epidaus parvus 
 Epidaus pellax 
 Epidaus pretiosus 
 Epidaus sexspinus 
 Epidaus transversus 
 Epidaus tuberosus 
 Epidaus validispinus 
 Epidaus wangi

References 

Heteroptera genera
Reduviidae